Pedro Zabála Pereira (born June 25, 1983 in Trinidad) is a Bolivian football defender. He currently plays for Real Mamoré in the Liga de Fútbol Profesional Boliviano.

National team
Zabála made his debut for the Bolivia national team on November 15, 2006, in a friendly match against El Salvador (5-1). He played the full 90 minutes.

References

External links

1983 births
Living people
People from Trinidad, Bolivia
Bolivian footballers
Bolivia international footballers
C.D. Jorge Wilstermann players
Municipal Real Mamoré players
Association football defenders